Six Flags New Orleans is an abandoned theme park located near the intersection of Interstate 10 and Interstate 510 in New Orleans. It first opened as Jazzland in 2000, and a leasing agreement was established with Six Flags in 2002 following the previous operator's bankruptcy proceedings. Six Flags invested $20 million in upgrades, and the park reopened as Six Flags New Orleans in 2003. Following the substantial damage caused by Hurricane Katrina, the park remained closed to the public in order to make efforts to repair and reopen it. However, in 2009, the city of New Orleans ended its 75-year lease with Six Flags, and the park consequently became permanently closed due to the extreme damage that was too severe to be repaired.

Six Flags salvaged several rides and relocated them to other parks. The Industrial Development Board (IDB) of New Orleans owns the property and oversees redevelopment plans. Following several failed proposals to redevelop the site, it remains abandoned and in poor condition. Videos and photos of the site have emerged over the years from thrill-seekers and YouTubers. As a result, city officials became more diligent in securing the park and banning tourists, tasking the New Orleans Police Department with patrolling the abandoned site and arresting trespassers. An option to demolish and clear the land was explored in 2019 following complaints from local residents, estimated to cost the city $1.3 million. In the meantime, the city continues to generate revenue from the property by occasionally leasing the park to various production companies as a filming location.

Functioning amusement park period, 2000–2005

Tom and Dian Winingder spent almost ten years arranging the partnership that would open Jazzland. In 1995, the developers solicited a loan from the United States Department of Housing and Urban Development (HUD), initially in the amount of $15 million, to complete the park. The partners included Burroughs & Chapin located in Myrtle Beach, South Carolina, which withdrew in 1997, and Ogden Corporation, which sold its theme park division to Alfa Alfa for $148 million in March 2000.

Jazzland (2000–2002)
The park opened under the name Jazzland on May 20, 2000; the crowd was estimated at 20–25,000 people, and 75–80,000 season passes had been sold. It was operated by Alfa SmartParks, a Greek holding company that purchased the Odgen Entertainment theme park division; the company has since changed hands and now is known as Palace Entertainment, owned by the Spanish company Parques Reunidos. The original themed areas were Mardi Gras, Pontchartrain Beach, Cajun Country, Jazz Plaza, Kids' Carnival, and The Goodtime Gardens; the first season ran until October 29, with season passes available for $89.99 (individual) or $219.96 (family of four). Rides included Mega Zeph, a wooden roller coaster track built on a steel frame to prevent termite infestation and withstand hurricane-force winds. Mega Zeph was inspired by the old Zephyr roller coaster at the closed Pontchartrain Beach Amusement Park that was next to Lake Pontchartrain by the University of New Orleans. The intent was to rebuild the Zephyr, but it was a smaller roller coaster, so that idea was scrapped in favor of the current larger Mega Zeph. Other rides included a junior steel coaster called Rex's Rail Runner, a wild mouse steel coaster, and a common steel shuttle looping Vekoma boomerang rollercoaster called Zydeco Scream. The park had a log flume called Cypress Plunge and a splashwater falls ride called Spillway Splashout. In addition, the park had common amusement park spinning rides and a carousel merry-go-round.

The park was not profitable, as Alfa SmartParks specialized in running water parks and smaller amusement arcade centers. It attracted 1.1 million visitors for its first season, but that decreased to 560 to 580 thousand the next season; Alfa filed for bankruptcy reorganization in February 2002. Citing its benefit to the local economy, HUD loaned $25.3 million to build the park, and after Alfa went bankrupt, the city of New Orleans became liable for the remainder of the loan. In 2001, the lease was put up for sale, and in March 2002 Six Flags purchased it for $22 M, although the park's name did not change that year. The New Orleans city council approved the 75-year lease in August 2002; under the negotiated agreement, repayment of the remaining $24.4 million loan from HUD was to be split between the park ($1.4 M/year) and the city ($1 M/yr).

Six Flags New Orleans (2003–2005)
Six Flags spent $20 million to upgrade the park and reopened it in April 2003 under the name Six Flags New Orleans. Six Flags added more shaded areas and many new flat spinning rides. The park was renamed Six Flags, and the "it's playtime!" theme was adopted that included a dancing old man, Mr. Six. They added a Bolliger & Mabillard inverted coaster named Batman: The Ride (a mirrored version of the B&M Batman: The Ride coaster model) relocated from the defunct Thrill Valley in Japan, and a Vekoma multiple looping coaster called The Jester relocated from Six Flags Fiesta Texas. A water park that would be included in the admission (like Six Flags Parks such as Six Flags St. Louis and Six Flags America, for example) was in the planning stages in early 2005 and was going to be announced at the end of August. However, Hurricane Katrina was about to strike New Orleans, which put those plans and the continued operations of the park in question.

The last day the park operated was Sunday August 21, 2005, eight days before Hurricane Katrina struck New Orleans. Weekday operations had ended a couple of weeks earlier, however, as schools start early in August in the New Orleans area and end in mid-May. The park was scheduled to reopen for the weekend on August 27 or August 28, but once Katrina was forecast late on Friday, August 26 to directly hit New Orleans, the weekend re-opening was cancelled in order to prepare for the storm and begin evacuations. By the time the park closed in 2005, Six Flags had spent $44 M on park upgrades.

Themed areas

Immediately after entering the main gate on the east side of the park, guests were directed to (clockwise):
 Main Street Square (Formerly Jazz Plaza)
 Cajun Country
 Pontchartrain Beach
 DC Comics Super Hero Adventures (park expansion, added by Six Flags in 2003)
 Mardi Gras
 Looney Tunes Adventures (Formerly Kids' Carnival)
 Goodtime Gardens
The park was built in a loop around Crescent City Basin; Pontchartrain Beach fronted Jazz Lake.

Hurricane Katrina 

Because the park was located next to Lake Pontchartrain, the park installed drainage pipes to protect it from flooding. On the morning of August 29, 2005, just after sunrise, Hurricane Katrina made landfall in Southeast Louisiana, resulting in 1,464 deaths and over $100 billion in damages. As many as 26,000 city residents took shelter at the Louisiana Superdome, and over 80% of New Orleans was flooded.

Water from Lake Pontchartrain overflowed and overwhelmed the drainage system at Six Flags New Orleans, which was unable to keep up with the flow of water, flooding the theme park for the duration of Katrina.

After Hurricane Katrina

The park grounds are located on a low-lying section of Eastern New Orleans, with a  earthen flood berm running along the perimeter, creating an artificial basin. As such, this area was heavily flooded in 2005 in the aftermath of Hurricane Katrina. Due to the extensive water and wind damage sustained, the park was closed indefinitely without plans to reopen.

Initial damage reports by Six Flags inspectors stated that the park buildings, the flat rides (except for one that was being serviced off-site at the time of the storm) and attractions were 80% destroyed by long term salt-water immersion and both the wooden track and steel superstructure of the Mega Zeph were likely damaged beyond repair. The only large ride to escape relatively unscathed was the Batman: The Ride roller-coaster, due to its elevated station platform and corrosion-resistant support structure.

On July 1, 2006, having announced that the park would be closed "at least" through 2007, Six Flags announced that it had concluded its damage assessments and declared the park to be an "effective total loss"—with no desire or intent by the company to undertake the prohibitive cost of rebuilding—and was in negotiations with the City of New Orleans to make an early exit from the 75-year lease that Six Flags entered into on the property in 2002. However, then-Mayor Ray Nagin said he planned to hold Six Flags to the lease agreement and force them to rebuild. If held to the terms of the lease agreement, Six Flags would have been legally obligated to rebuild the park on the same site, but only to the extent of the insurance money Six Flags received. Six Flags determined the value of assets destroyed by the storm at $32.5 million. As of September 2006, Six Flags had collected $11.5 million of insurance proceeds, bringing the insurance receivable balance to $24.4 million. In January 2007, Six Flags officials revealed to the New Orleans Times-Picayune that the company was suing its insurers for the remaining $17.5 million in coverage.

The park had been one of the least profitable parks in the Six Flags portfolio. Though the park was located in New Orleans East near some of the area's more affluent neighborhoods, the park was originally budgeted to bring in tourists from the city's downtown attractions to supplement the city's relatively smaller population base (New Orleans had been experiencing a declining population before Hurricane Katrina). However, near the time that the storm struck, Six Flags had already begun closing some of its smaller, less profitable parks across the country. Hurricane Katrina cemented the New Orleans park as another of Six Flags' portfolio that would eventually close permanently.

On December 15, 2006, Six Flags confirmed that it was removing Batman: The Ride for refurbishment and relocation to a new park, as it was considered to be the only salvageable ride. Batman: The Ride was reassembled at Six Flags Fiesta Texas in San Antonio and opened under the new name Goliath on April 18, 2008. In addition to Batman: The Ride, Six Flags removed shade coverings, ride parts, lights, security cameras, planting structures and various other salvageable items.

Besides Batman: The Ride, other rides were later removed from the park. Bayou Blaster and Sonic Slam were removed in 2008 and taken to Great Escape in Queensbury, New York, where the ride was refurbished and reopened under the name Sasquatch on May 10, 2009. The Road Runner Express was removed in 2009 and taken to Six Flags Magic Mountain in Valencia, California, where it was refurbished and reopened on May 28, 2011, under the same name.

As late as the fall of 2009, the Six Flags website said the company was "still in the process of settling claims with its insurers due to substantial damage caused by Hurricane Katrina," adding that the park would remain closed. The statement ended with "We know that it is still a difficult time for the residents of New Orleans and we remain committed to working with the city in support of the recovery efforts."

Rides and attractions

Former rides

Redevelopment proposals

Southern Star Amusement (2008–2011)

In April 2008, Southern Star Amusement Inc. proposed to take over the site lease from the then-owner Six Flags, promising to expand the park to over 60 rides (more than double its pre-Katrina size), complete a water park that Six Flags had been planning, and add an RV park. Southern Star Amusement Inc. pledged to open the park as Legend City Adventure Park, with 60 rides in place, including a new water park by the summer of 2009 if the city approved the lease takeover, with the campground to follow. One issue concerning rebuilding was Six Flags' continued removal of infrastructure from the park. In a quarterly conference call Six Flags discussed plans to remove the S&S Towers by 2009 with more ride removals to follow. Items from existing Jazzland rides, such as Mega Zeph's trains and Spillway Splashout's boats, were sent to other parks. On September 27, 2008, Southern Star stated on its website that it would no longer be trying to revive Six Flags New Orleans.

In February 2009, Southern Star was taking another look at the park and considering a takeover bid with the City of New Orleans. Southern Star planned a scaled down effort, with intentions only to reopen the park with a water park added within the existing midway area. The idea was to reopen and build incrementally, saving about $50 million in improvements for the next few years. Given the poor economic situation at the time, this plan seemed to be the only way that the park could be saved. The basic idea was to use investors and Go Zone Bonds to raise the $35 to $40 million needed to just reopen the park with basic improvements that are needed to make a real recovery and profit. Southern Star's CEO Danny R. Rogers asked that Six Flags stop all removal action of equipment from the park, as the equipment in question belongs to the City of New Orleans and not Six Flags. The return of other equipment taken from the park by Six Flags was also requested.

On August 18, 2009, it was announced that the land would be redeveloped into a Nickelodeon Universe theme/water park.

On September 18, 2009, the city of New Orleans fined Six Flags $3 million and ordered the company to vacate its lease with the park. On June 13, 2009,  Six Flags filed for Chapter 11 bankruptcy protection. The City of New Orleans took ownership of the park shortly after.

As of early 2010, the site was overgrown with debris and weeds. Removal of the debris and underbrush had begun.

As of April 11, 2010, the site was still shut down with no clear future, since the city of New Orleans owned the property by this time and the plans for the Nickelodeon-branded theme park fell through three months after bonds failed to come through.

On January 21, 2011, Southern Star went public with its third redevelopment plans for the park, posting a link on their company website. On January 26, 2011, Southern Star posted a Letter of Intent for the park on its website. The redevelopment plans gave a brief history of the property, pre and post-Katrina condition photos, development concept photos, written descriptions of each phase of the redevelopment procedure and business projections for when it opens. During "Phase I", Southern Star planned to restore what is left of the park, and expand it by adding more rides and reverting the park back to its original Louisiana theme. The park would be revamped to reflect Louisiana's history and heritage, with one of the proposed sections paying tribute to the now defunct Pontchartrain Beach, which closed in 1983. "Phase II" entailed adding a water park and future expansion phases included adding a youth sports complex, an on-site hotel/resort and a movie studio/backlot that would cater to the needs of various production companies filming in the New Orleans area. Plans also included developing an entertainment and shopping district within the park. These plans entailed utilizing all  of the site of which only  were to be developed and occupied by the remains of the Six Flags New Orleans park. The Letter of Intent from Southern Star set out a lease agreement between the city and the company stating Southern Star's proposed terms of the lease and its intent for utilizing and restoring the area. The company would enter a 75-year lease and take on the property in its current condition. Southern Star planned to take possession of the property prior to the establishment of the lease in order to provide preliminary security and repair/cleanup services. The lease would not have taken effect until Southern Star had taken possession of the property, started the cleanup process and provided proof of funding to the city. After that, the city had 15 days to execute its end of the agreement. Any and all improvements made would belong to the company and the lease would end in the year 2018. The plans never came to fruition, however.

Jazzland Outlet Mall (2011–2014)

In August 2011, The City of New Orleans called for proposals for redevelopment ideas for the site. Eight entrepreneurs stepped forward to suggest turning the property into a power plant, a theme park, or even an outlet mall. On November 29, 2011, the city of New Orleans chose two of the proposed projects: an outlet mall and a green theme park. On February 6, 2012, it was reported that the selection committee rejected the plan for the site of Six Flags New Orleans to become a theme park, leaving the upscale outlet mall as the only proposal being considered by the committee.  Despite the committee's actions, one of the original eight entrepreneurs continued to try to get public support for their Jazzland Park proposal, which includes the addition of a water park and movie studio back lot.

On March 6, 2012, the city of New Orleans gave the green light to build Jazzland Outlet Mall to Provident Realty Advisors and DAG Development. The proposal was for a  upscale outlet mall and entertainment boardwalk on the former theme park site, costing $40 million for part of Phase One and using some of the existing rides from the theme park. Construction would have taken between three and four years. During the planned period of due diligence and pre-construction, in March 2013 the development plans were abruptly called off. The developer cited competition from the planned expansion of Riverwalk Marketplace to include an outlet mall, making the Jazzland Outlet Mall concept unviable. However, as of the summer of 2013, Provident Realty Advisors and DAG Development has been back at the negotiating table with the city to come up with a new idea for the park; they will have to present a development plan to the Industrial Development Board (IDB) in October 2013, according to a contract. Once presented IDB will then accept or reject the proposal. The contract also states that construction of an outlet mall is to proceed, but it does not explicitly prohibit giving the developers an opportunity to put something else there.

Use as film shoot location (2011–present)

In 2011, Killer Joe was filmed in the park featuring the wooden coaster Mega Zeph. Stolen was also filmed at the park that year. Stolen used the Main Street Square section to double as the Quarter. Additionally, a burning car was driven into the lagoon and the Orpheum Theatre was used as the home of the film's villain.

The Industrial Development Board (IDB) agreed to let 20th Century Fox film the 2013 film Percy Jackson: Sea of Monsters in the theme park during the summer of 2012 through August. Mega Zeph, Ozarka Splash and The Big Easy are three rides that have been shot for the film along with five other rides that the production crew had brought into the park, since all the original rides were rendered inoperable to shoot for the film. Before shooting at the park for five weeks, the production crew took two weeks to restore the derelict park into the needed condition by installing lighting and covering up graffiti on the buildings. The park portrays the fictional Circeland on the island of Polyphemus that was built by the goddess Circe, only to be destroyed by the cyclops Polyphemus.

During the summer of 2013, portions of the park were being filmed for the movie Dawn of the Planet of the Apes until mid-August. The park was also used to film portions of the movie Jurassic World in June 2014.

Jurassic World used the parking lot as the location for the Jurassic World park. Deepwater Horizon built its oil rig set in the parking lot.

In January 2015, the park was photographed as part of a photo essay/series by Cleveland-based photographer Johnny Joo. In this series, Joo documented the abandoned or historic structures of New Orleans, which still remained 10 years after Hurricane Katrina. He also documented portions of revitalization in the community of New Orleans to show how the area has been rebuilt after one of the largest natural disasters in United States history.

In 2016, the video game Mafia III, is set in a fictional version of New Orleans. The abandoned amusement park in that game features a partially flooded site, a similar entranceway, and a roller-coaster which strongly resembles the Mega Zeph.

In 2019, rapper NF used parts of the park for his music video for "Leave Me Alone." Also in 2019 parts of the park were used in the movie Synchronic starring Anthony Mackie.

In 2019, the park was the subject of the Bright Sun Films documentary titled Closed for Storm. The documentary features visuals of the park in its current state, as well as interviews with past employees, fans, and developers interested in rebuilding the property. It received a wide release in July 2021.

The park was used as a movie location for the 2021 movie Reminiscence.

Dreamlanding Festival Park (2016–2018) 
In 2016, a group that included the former head of Southern Star came together to form "Dreamlanding Festival Park" in order to buy and rebuild this park, pending city council/mayoral approval. According to their website, the group was ready to spend over $100 million to re-open the park, with construction scheduled to begin in the summer of 2018, a stated opening date of 2019 and more coasters ready for 2020. At the same time, a waterpark would open in spring 2019. A festival park and an RV site were also in their plans as they awaited the city's approval to purchase the park.

In 2018, on the Dreamlanding Festival Park website, the following statement was released: "It is very hard to walk away from all the time and efforts we have put into New Orleans but in truth the old Jazzland/Six Flags park has now reached a point of no return. On our last inspection and after further review we find that the rides that were savable as well as the majority of buildings are no longer economically viable to salvage."

Jazzland Paidia Company (2011–2021)

In 2011, eight groups, including the Paidia Company, responded to an RFP issued by the Mayor's office.  Paidia proposed to re-open the park as Jazzland, the park's name until 2002. The company was not selected during the first RFP. A second RFP was issued in January 2014. Jazzland submitted the only proposal. The plans include newly designed themes for the park, a new Baritone Beach water park, Sportsman's Paradise Resort Hotel and a mixed-use retail/dining/entertainment area. A few rides would be rebuilt, but most would be new. A "Sportsman's Paradise" section would include the existing Jester coaster, the "Beach" would include Megazeph. Ozarka Splash would be rebuilt as a "sugar flume", using the state's sugar cane industry for its theme.  In February 2017, the company submitted a purchase offer for the property.  In May 2017, the IDB voted to turn over decision making power to the Mayor's office.  In June 2018 the IDB renewed the cooperative agreement with the new Mayor, keeping the decision power with the mayor's office.  Jazzland maintains its interest in purchasing the property.

Bayou Phoenix (2021-2022)
In October 2021, New Orleans Mayor LaToya Cantrell announced Bayou Phoenix as the partner chosen to redevelop the site. On November 10, 2022, the redevelopment plans were announced to be "on life support" and "could be dead soon", as no lease agreement has been reached.

References

External links

 

 
Amusement parks in New Orleans
New Orleans
2000 establishments in Louisiana
Defunct amusement parks in the United States
2005 disestablishments in Louisiana
Amusement parks opened in 2000
Amusement parks closed in 2005
Modern ruins
Effects of Hurricane Katrina